Holly Morris may refer to:

 Holly Morris (author), author, television producer, and correspondent
 Holly Morris (television reporter), Washington, D.C. television reporter